Thornville is a town in Richmond Local Municipality in the KwaZulu-Natal province of South Africa.

References

Populated places in the Richmond Local Municipality